Maurice Lamar Whitfield (born March 29, 1973) is a former American-born Czech professional basketball player. He played at the point guard position.

Professional career
Whitfield played several seasons in Nymburk, leading the team to the Czech Championship. He played for Ural Great Perm of the Russian Super League. In the 2007–08 season, he played in Greece for Olympias Patras.

In January 2008, he signed with Akasvayu Girona of Spain for the rest of the 2007–08 season. From 2009 to 2012 he played with Lleida Bàsquet, where he finished his career.

Czech national team
Whitfield played for the Czech Republic national basketball team at the FIBA EuroBasket 2007 in Spain.

References

External links
 ACB League profile

1973 births
Living people
American men's basketball players
Czech men's basketball players
American emigrants to the Czech Republic
African-American basketball players
American expatriate basketball people in Croatia
American expatriate basketball people in Greece
American expatriate basketball people in Russia
American expatriate basketball people in Spain
American expatriate basketball people in the Czech Republic
American expatriate basketball people in the Dominican Republic
Basketball players from Philadelphia
CB Girona players
Basketball Nymburk players
Liga ACB players
Norfolk State Spartans men's basketball players
Olympias Patras B.C. players
PBC Ural Great players
Point guards
KK Kvarner players
21st-century African-American sportspeople
20th-century African-American sportspeople